Tatvaviveka (Sanskrit तत्वविवेक, IAST; tatvaviveka) is the first chapter of the first quintads Viveka-panchaka (विवेक-पचंक, viveka-pacaṃka) of Vidyaranya Panchadasi dealing with the discrimination of knowledge of the ultimate Reality).

See also 
Advaita Vedanta
Bhagwat Gita
Upanishads
Samkhya

References

Sources

Sanskrit 
Panchadashi Sanskrit at nic.in

English 
Commentary on the Panchadasi - Swami Krishnananda
The Philosophy of Panchadasi by Swami Krishnananda
Commentary on Panchadasi by Swami Paramarthananda
Panchadashi - SN Sastri
Panchadashi - Ramakrishna Mission

Sanskrit texts
Vedanta
Advaita Vedanta